Damer is a crater on Mercury in the Shakespeare quadrangle. Its diameter is 60 km. It was named after the English sculptor Anne Seymour Damer in 2013.

Views

References

Impact craters on Mercury